Muhammet Arda Uzun (born 24 April 2005) is a Turkish professional footballer who plays as a forward for the Under-19 squad of Alanyaspor.

Professional career
Uzun was a product of the youth academies of Çeliktepe Ümitspor and Sarıyer, before signing shis first professional contract with Alanyaspor on 2 January 2021. He made his professional debut with Alanyaspor in a 1–0 Süper Lig win over MKE Ankaragücü on 15 May 2021.

International career
Uzun was called up for a training camp for the Turkey U15s in October 2020.

References

External links

2005 births
Living people
People from Şişli
Footballers from Istanbul
Turkish footballers
Association football forwards
Alanyaspor footballers
Süper Lig players
TFF Third League players